Eye to Ear III is a studio album by English guitarist, composer, and improvisor Fred Frith. The album is a collection of film music composed and performed by Frith, and is the third of three Eye to Ear albums dedicated to his work for short films. It was recorded in Germany and the United States in 2003 and 2004.

Eye to Ear III comprises two suites, Troja Suite from Hussi Kutulcan's 2005 film Drei Gegen Troja (Three Against Troy), and Water Music from Deborah Kauffman and Alan Snitow's 2004 documentary, Thirst.

Track listing
All tracks composed by Fred Frith.

Source:

Personnel
Fred Frith – guitar, bass guitar, keyboards, home-made instruments
Wu Fei – gu zheng
Ada Gosling – violin (Troja Suite)
Bernd Settelmeyer – percussion, waterphone (Troja Suite)
Tilman Müller – trumpet, flugelhorn (Troja Suite)
Carla Kihlstedt – violin, nyckelharpa (Water Music)
Sheela Bringi – bansuri (Water Music)
Heather Heise – melodica, piano (Water Music)
Gino Robair – percussion (Water Music)

Source:

Sound and artwork
Water Music recorded at Guerrilla Recordings in Oakland, California, June and November 2003; Troja Suite recorded at Jankowski SoundFabrik in Esslingen, Germany, July 2004
Myles Boisen – engineer (Water Music), audio mixer
Peter Hardt – engineer (Troja Suite)
Fred Frith – producer
Heike Liss – photographer

Source:

References

2010 albums
Fred Frith albums
Tzadik Records albums
Albums produced by Fred Frith